Aladağ  is a village in Toroslar district of Mersin Province, Turkey, where the capital city of Toroslar district is actually a part of Greater Mersin. The village is situated in forests of Taurus Mountains overlooking Müftü River valley at the west and there are picnic sites as well as summer resort houses in the  vicinity of the village The population of Aladağ  was 290  as of 2012. Main agricultural product is olive.

References

.

Villages in Toroslar District